Microlunatus sagamiharensis is a Gram-positive, non-motile, aerobic actinomycete.

References

Further reading
Whitman, William B., et al., eds. Bergey's manual® of systematic bacteriology. Vol. 5. Springer, 2012.
Dworkin, Martin, and Stanley Falkow, eds. The Prokaryotes: Vol. 3: Archaea. Bacteria: Firmicutes, Actinomycetes. Vol. 3. Springer Verlag, 2006.

External links 
LPSN

Type strain of Friedmanniella sagamiharensis at BacDive -  the Bacterial Diversity Metadatabase

Propionibacteriales
Bacteria described in 2010